Jorge García Isaza (July 2, 1928 – August 16, 2016) was a Colombian Roman Catholic bishop.

Ordained to the priesthood in 1964, García Isaza served as prefect apostolic of the Apostolic Vicariate of Tierradentro, Colombia, from 2000 to 2003.

See also
Roman Catholicism in Colombia

Notes

External links

1928 births
2016 deaths
21st-century Roman Catholic bishops in Colombia
Roman Catholic bishops of Tierradentro